Jacob Daniel Stallings (born December 22, 1989) is an American professional baseball catcher for the Miami Marlins of Major League Baseball (MLB). He made his MLB debut with the Pittsburgh Pirates in 2016. In 2021, Stallings won the Gold Glove Award and Fielding Bible Award. After the 2021 season, the Pirates traded Stallings to Miami.

Amateur career
Stallings attended Brentwood Academy in Brentwood, Tennessee, and the University of North Carolina at Chapel Hill, where he played college baseball for the North Carolina Tar Heels. In 2009 and 2010, he played collegiate summer baseball with the Chatham Anglers of the Cape Cod Baseball League. The Cincinnati Reds selected Stallings in the 42nd round of the 2011 MLB draft, but he did not sign, and returned to North Carolina for his senior year. The Pittsburgh Pirates selected him in the seventh round of the 2012 MLB draft and he signed.

Professional career

Pittsburgh Pirates
Stallings made his professional debut that same year with the State College Spikes where he batted .230/.324/.332 in 66 games. He also played in one game for the Altoona Curve at the end of the season. In 2013, he played for the Bradenton Marauders where he hit .219 with six home runs and 23 RBIs in 78 games, and in 2014, he returned to Bradenton where he batted .241 with four home runs and 30 RBIs in 68 games. Stallings spent 2015 with Altoona where he slashed .275/.313/.370 with three home runs and 32 RBIs in 74 games. He began the 2016 season with the Indianapolis Indians.

Stallings was called up to the majors for the first time on June 19, 2016. Stallings recorded his first major league hit, a double, on June 21 against the San Francisco Giants. He was designated for assignment on July 5, and outrighted to back to Indianapolis after clearing waivers. In 80 games for Indianapolis, he hit .214/.252/.350 with six home runs and 28 RBIs. Stallings was recalled again by the Pirates on September 13. On September 23, he had a game-winning RBI single in the Pirates' 6–5 win over the Washington Nationals. He was outrighted on November 2, 2016.

In 2017, Stallings spent a majority of the season with Indianapolis, slashing .301/.358/.431 with four home runs and 38 RBIs in 62 games. He also played in five games for Pittsburgh. He began 2018 with Indianapolis, and was recalled by the Pirates on June 10. On September 17, he had a game-winning RBI single in the Pirates 7–6 win over the Kansas City Royals. 

In 2018 with Pittsburgh he batted 216/.268/.216. He was outrighted off the roster on May 17, 2019.

In 2020, Stallings batted .248/.326/.376 for the Pirates with three home runs and 18 RBIs. He had the slowest time from home plate to first base of all major leaguers, at 5.09.

On July 17, 2021, Stallings hit a walk-off grand slam to beat the New York Mets 9–7, the third walk-off grand slam in PNC Park history. Stallings finished the 2021 season batting .246/.335/.369 with eight home runs and 53 RBIs in 113 games. He won the Gold Glove Award and Fielding Bible Award that year.

Miami Marlins

On November 29, 2021, the Pirates traded Stallings to the Miami Marlins for Zach Thompson and minor leaguers Kyle Nicolas and Connor Scott.

His salary for the 2022 season was decided in an arbitration hearing on June 18. He requested $3.1 million, and was awarded $2.45 million.

On January 13, 2023, Stallings agreed to a one-year, $3.35 million contract with the Marlins, avoiding salary arbitration.

Personal life
His father, Kevin Stallings, was formerly the head basketball coach of Illinois State, Vanderbilt, and the Pittsburgh Panthers men's basketball teams.

References

External links

1989 births
Living people
Sportspeople from Lawrence, Kansas
Baseball players from Kansas
Major League Baseball catchers
Pittsburgh Pirates players
Miami Marlins players
Gold Glove Award winners
North Carolina Tar Heels baseball players
Chatham Anglers players
State College Spikes players
Altoona Curve players
Bradenton Marauders players
Indianapolis Indians players